Sanjay Kumar Singh also known as Sanjay Yadav is an Indian politician. He was elected to the Bihar Legislative Assembly from Karakaat Member of Bihar Legislative Assembly as a member of the Rashtriya Janata Dal in 2015.

References

1977 births
Living people
People from Rohtas district
Bihar MLAs 2015–2020
Rashtriya Janata Dal politicians